Irmak  is a Unisex Turkish given name. In Turkish, "Irmak" means "river".

People

Given name
 Irmak Arkadaşlar, a Turkish contestant in the north team of Survivor: Büyük Macera.
 Irmak Atuk, a Turkish model and titleholder of Best Model of Turkey 2002.
 Irmak Ünal, a Turkish actor and daughter of Cihan Ünal (see Turkish Wikipedia article).
 Irmak Yıldırım (born 2005), Turkish female motocross racer

Surname
 Çağan Irmak, Turkish film director, producer and screenwriter
 Sadi Irmak, Turkish politician

Fictional characters
 Irmak Bozoğlu, a character of Turkish TV series Alacakaranlık played by Cansu Dere

Turkish-language surnames
Turkish feminine given names